Yuriy Vladislavovych Barbashov (Ukrainian: Юрій Владиславович Барбашов, Russian: Юрий Владиславович Барбашов) is a Ukrainian politician and nominal head of the collaborationist Russian Mykolaiv Military civilian administration.

Biography 
Yuriy Barbashov was born in Mykolaiv, Ukraine. In 1998, he graduated from the Admiral Makarov University of Shipbuilding in Mykolaiv. Since 2013, he has been involved with Anti-Maidan movements and protests as well as supporting the Novorossiya project. In 2014, he moved to the Luhansk People's Republic, where he participated in rallies with Oleg Tsarov, and later to the Donetsk People's Republic. In the latter, he joined the Militsiya and also became an employee of the public broadcaster. In 2021, he participated in peace negotiations in Minsk as part of the LPR delegation. He has appeared many times in the Russian media, he also ran his own channel on Telegram and a YouTube channel with the same name, mainly presenting pro-Russian views to the audience. Since 2017, Ukraine is investigating him in a terrorist case.

2022 Russian Invasion of Ukraine 
During the 2022 Russian Invasion of Ukraine, Yuriy Barbashov supported a lot of edro-Russian activity in the Mykolaiv Oblast. He created a website where he displayed pro-Russian propaganda, which was later hacked and shut down by Ukrainian hackers. After Russian forces failed to occupy Mykolaiv Oblast, the Mykolaiv Military Civilian Administration was created with its headquarters being in Snihurivka. Barbashov helped Russian forces capture small villages near Snihurivka and was appointed as governor of the Mykolaiv MCA. His administration was preparing a referendum to join Russia. On 11 September, following a major Ukrainian counteroffensive, it was announced that the proposed annexation referendum would be "indefinitely" postponed. On 11 November Ukrainian forces regained control of almost all of Mikolayiv oblast with only the Kinburn Peninsula remaining under Russian occupation.

References 

1975 births
Living people
Politicians from Mykolaiv
Pro-government people of the Euromaidan
Ukrainian collaborators with Russia
Fugitives wanted by Ukraine
Treason in Ukraine